Linus Fernström (born April 10, 1987) is a Swedish professional ice hockey goaltender who currently plays for Brynäs IF in the Swedish Hockey League (SHL). He has formerly played with Frölunda HC and Karlskrona HK in the SHL. He split the 2016–17 season between HK Poprad of the Slovak Extraliga and IF Björklöven in the HockeyAllsvenskan (Allsv) before joining Brynäs IF.

References

External links

1987 births
Living people
Almtuna IS players
IF Björklöven players
Brynäs IF players
Frölunda HC players
Karlskrona HK players
IK Oskarshamn players
HK Poprad players
Swedish ice hockey goaltenders
Swedish expatriate ice hockey players in Norway
Swedish expatriate sportspeople in Slovakia
Expatriate ice hockey players in Slovakia